Tatsuma (written: 立真, 竜馬 or 達磨) is a masculine Japanese given name. Notable people with the name include:

, Japanese manga artist
, Japanese tennis player
, Japanese footballer

Japanese masculine given names